Nathan or Natan may refer to:

People 
Nathan (given name), including a list of people and characters with this name
Nathan (surname)

Nathan (prophet), a person in the Hebrew Bible
Nathan (son of David), biblical figure, son of King David and Bathsheba
Nathan of Gaza, a charismatic figure who spread the word of Eli the Prophet
Starboy Nathan, a British singer who used the stage name "Nathan" from 2006 to 2011
Nathan (footballer, born 1994), full name Nathan Athaydes Campos Ferreira, Brazilian winger
Nathan (footballer, born 1995), full name Nathan Raphael Pelae Cardoso, Brazilian centre back
Nathan (footballer, born 1996), full name Nathan Allan de Souza, Brazilian midfielder
Nathan (footballer, born May 1999), full name Nathan Crepaldi da Cruz, Brazilian forward
Nathan (footballer, born August 1999), full name Nathan Palafoz de Sousa, Brazilian forward
Nathan (footballer, born 2002), Brazilian footballer

Other uses 
Nathan, Queensland, a suburb of Brisbane in Australia
Nathan (band), an alt-country band from Winnipeg, Manitoba, Canada
Vethan or "Nathan", a deity in Ayyavazhi theology
Éditions Nathan, a French publishing house, a subsidiary of Editis
Nathan Manufacturing (Airchime, Ltd.), a train horn manufacturer
Nathan Road, the main thoroughfare in Kowloon, Hong Kong
Nathan (album), a 1994 album by Nathan Cavaleri
The title character of Nathan the Wise, a 1779 play by Gotthold Ephraim Lessing

See also 
All pages beginning with Nathan
Nate (disambiguation)
Na Tan District in Ubon Ratchathani Province, Thailand
Natan Couture, a Belgian fashion house created and owned by Édouard Vermeulen